Z'har  is a 2009 film.

Synopsis 
1997: Alia is a Parisian photographer, travelling from Tunis to Constantine (Algiers) to see her sick father. Cherif is a writer and has just read, according to the newspapers, that he's dead. Their driver is a cab driver used to doing the Tunis-Constantine route. 2007: Fatma Zohra asks her brother to go with her on a location scout. The film is dear to her heart because it portrays the violence that swept Algiers during the nineties. The crew starts out on a two thousand kilometre journey that leads to a hypothetical fiction or the dream of one during which the main characters get to know one another. But the project can't find financing. How does one carry out a fiction when all is against you?

Awards 
 International Film Festival of Kerala (India)
 Pune International Film Festival (India)
 Famafest (Portugal)
 Festival Cinema Africano
 AsI
 America Latina de Milano (Italia)
 Festival Indie Lisboa (Portugal)

External links 

2009 films
Algerian drama films
French drama films
2000s French films